Rimer may refer to:

People
 Bingo Rimér (born 1975), Swedish photographer
 Colin Rimer (born 1944), English judge
 Danny Rimer (born 1970), Canadian-Swiss venture capitalist
 Jeff Rimer (born 1955), hockey announcer
 J. Thomas Rimer (born 1933), American scholar
 Kirk Rimer, American investment manager
 Lindsay Rimer (1981 – c. 1994), British murder victim
 Neil Rimer (born 1963), Canadian-Swiss venture capitalist
 Rimer Cardillo (born 1944), Uruguayan artist

Other uses
 Rimer, Ohio

See also
 Rime (disambiguation)
 Rimmer, a surname